The Polar Bear Express is a Canadian passenger train operated by the Ontario Northland Railway in Northern Ontario. Service was introduced in 1964. While designated as a passenger train, the Polar Bear Express also carries freight and is equipped with specialized equipment including boxcars for canoes, snowmobiles and all terrain vehicles, chaincars (flat cars with tie downs) for carrying cars and light trucks (there are no roads to Moosonee so vehicles come in and out by train) and baggage and express cars. In the past a special car for canoes was included but these are now carried in boxcars.

It operates five days per week year-round and connects Cochrane with Moosonee. During the summer months there is an additional train on Sundays and the train often includes a full-length dome car. Prior to 2012, the train carried a full dining car during the summer.

Scheduled Stops 
Tickets for the passenger service are sold by phone or at offices in Cochrane,
Moosonee, Moose Factory and Timmins. The train will stop on demand in some locations as part of the flag stop service.

The town of Cochrane recommends taking the train to Moosonee for a "great rail excursion" in summer, to view the "hydroelectric dams, isolated homes and perhaps even some wildlife." 

The Polar Bear Express service was expanded on June 5, 2007, after increased funding from the Government of Ontario to ONR was announced in March 2007. It resulted in the discontinuation of the Little Bear mixed freight-passenger service which had operated three days per week, year-round, resulting in dedicated separate freight and passenger rail service to Moosonee.

Operations 

In summer 2008, track conditions resulted the train running very late much of the time (2.5 hours by railway announcement). By late 2008, running times had improved somewhat and timings of five and a half to six hours for the 186 mile (300 kilometre - all distances are shown in miles along the tracks) trip were becoming typical. Service deteriorated significantly in 2009 mainly due to bad track conditions and mechanical failures — on one occasion the train, scheduled to arrive in Cochrane at 9:42 in the evening did not arrive until 4:00 in the morning.

Before the 2007 service expansion, the Polar Bear Express operated six days per week during the summer months. It leaves Cochrane in the morning, stays in Moosonee for a few hours, and returns to Cochrane in the evening. It was primarily used by tourists, although it was used by an increasing number of local residents.

The name of the train is misleading — polar bears are rarely seen anywhere near Moosonee, although there are some extremely rare exceptions. The Polar Bear Express today mostly services the residents of Moosonee and Moose Factory when they travel south from their communities that lack road connections to the rest of Ontario. During the winter, many passengers are from communities further north who travel to Moosonee by winter road before taking the train, due to the high cost of vehicle transport.

Prior to 2012 the summer train included special programs for children and an entertainment car.

Gallery

See also
 Northlander

References

External links

Official Website

Ontario Northland Railway
Named passenger trains of Ontario
Transport in Cochrane, Ontario
Railway services introduced in 1964